Broxhead and Kingsley Commons is a  biological Site of Special Scientific Interest north of Lindford in Hampshire. It is part of Wealden Heaths Phase II Special Protection Area for the Conservation  of  Wild  Birds and Broxhead Common is a  Local Nature Reserve owned and managed by Hampshire County Council.

These commons have areas of heath, acid grassland, woodland and scrub. The site is one of the most important in southern Britain for lichens, with more than 25 terricolous species, and there are also three protected birds, 25 rare bees, wasps and ants, and the nationally rare sand lizard.

References

 

Local Nature Reserves in Hampshire
Sites of Special Scientific Interest in Hampshire